Let's Be Frank is the fourteenth studio album by American country artist Trisha Yearwood. It was first released through Williams Sonoma stores on December 20, 2018 and was widely released on February 14, 2019 via Gwendolyn Records. The project was produced by Don Was and arranged by Vincent Mendoza. The album pays tribute to Frank Sinatra, whom Yearwood had always admired. It was a record that Yearwood had always wanted to create but never got around to doing so. Let's Be Frank includes covers of songs notably performed by Sinatra and also features one original composition.

Background and production
According to Yearwood, she had always wanted to record album of traditional pop songs. She was originally approached by producer Don Was following her televised performance at Frank Sinatra's 2015 "100th Birthday" tribute. The album was recorded in summer 2018 in four days at the Capitol Records Building in Hollywood, California. She performed the tracks with Sinatra's original microphone and was accompanied by a 55-piece orchestra.  Let's Be Frank was arranged by Vincent Mendoza. Yearwood called the collaboration with Mendoza something she "couldn't be more proud of". She also noted his previous work with Tony Bennett, Ray Charles and Barbra Streisand.

Yearwood drew inspiration for Let's Be Frank from her childhood. In an interview with iHeart Radio, Yearwood explained that her mother was fond of Frank Sinatra and for that reason, she "grew up" listening to him. She also mentioned that many of the songs Sinatra recorded were covered by other artists. These songs also appeared in films and television shows that she watched as a young child.

Content
According to Yearwood, the material for Let's Be Frank originated from the Great American Songbook catalog. While many of these songs had been recorded by Frank Sinatra, their original versions by other artists may be more memorable. Two notable recordings she covered by Sinatra included "Come Fly with Me" and "One for My Baby (and One More for the Road)". Yearwood also noted that "Come Fly with Me" was one of the most challenging songs to record because of its rhythm. The track "I'll Be Seeing You" was an especially emotional song to sing, according to Yearwood. She commented in 2019 that the song made her think of her mother, Gwen.

The track "For the Last Time" originally was a line that Yearwood had thought of. Her husband Garth Brooks assisted by composing a melody to accompany her idea. It is the only original composition to appear on the album. Yearwood commented in 2019 that she not want the song to appear on Let's Be Frank because she feared it would disrespect the music of Sinatra. She was encouraged to play the song to her producer Don Was. Was enjoyed the song and arranged for the track to be recorded for the project.

Critical reception
Let's Be Frank received critical acclaim upon its major release to stores. Stephen Thomas Erlewine of Allmusic called the album not exactly "the kind of comeback most observers would've expected from Trisha Yearwood." Erlewine went on to call the record a "well-balanced songbook" that included diverse arrangements and song choices. Kevin John Coyne of Country Universe gave Let's Be Frank four of five possible stars in his review. Coyne highlighted tracks such as "One for My Baby (and One More for the Road)" and "For the Last Time". He also compared Yearwood's song selection to that of Emmylou Harris and Linda Ronstadt. Coyne later concluded his review of the album by saying, "Let's Be Frank is a delightful detour, and while it doesn't curb the hunger for more country music from the greatest female artist of the greatest generation of female artists, it is chock full of reminders of how she earned that distinction in the first place."

Commercial performance
Let's Be Frank was first issued on December 20, 2018 exclusively through Williams-Sonoma retailers. It was officially released to all major retailers on February 14, 2019. Both of these releases were distributed through Gwendolyn Records. Upon its initial release, the album would peak at number 2 on the Billboard Jazz Albums chart and number 7 on the Billboard Top Independent Albums chart. Let's Be Frank marked Yearwood's first solo album since 2007's Heaven, Heartache and the Power of Love and first to chart as well. Yearwood made numerous promotional appearances to support the album. She made her first appearance when launching songs off the album at the Rainbow Room in New York City. This included a performance of "For the First Time" on The Today Show in early 2019.

Track listing

Personnel 
All credits are adapted from Allmusic.

Musical personnel
 Trisha Yearwood – vocals
 Alan Pasqua – grand piano
 Chuck Berghofer – bass
 Peter Erskine – drums
 Vince Mendoza – arrangements and conductor
 Bruce Dukov – concertmaster

Brass and Woodwinds
 Gene Cipriano – tenor saxophone
 Rose Coorigan – bassoon
 Jeff Driskill – clarinet, flute, tenor saxophone
 Dan Higgins – clarinet, flute, alto saxophone
 Greg Huckins – clarinet, flute, alto saxophone, baritone saxophone
 Damian Montano – bassoon
 Adam Schroeder – bass clarinet, baritone saxophone
 Bob Sheppard – clarinet, alto flute, tenor saxophone
 Lara Wickes – oboe
 Ryan Dragon – trombone, tenor trombone
 Julianne Gralle – trombone
 Andrew Martin – bass trombone
 Bob McChesney – trombone
 Charlie Morillas – tenor trombone
 Wayne Bergeron – trumpet 
 Gary Grant – trumpet
 Larry Hall – trumpet
 Michael Rocha – trumpet 
 Bob Schaer – trumpet
 Jim Self – tuba
 Annie Bosler – French horn
 Laura Brenes – French horn
 Dylan Hart – French horn

String Section
 Jacob Braun, Stephen Erdody, Ross Gasworth, Dennis Karmazyn, Michael Kaufman, Armen Ksajikian, Laszlo Mezo, Cecilla Tsan and Charles Tyler – cello
 Ed Beares and Milke Valerio – contrabass
 Marcia Dickstein – harp
 Rob Brophy, Zach Dellinger, Brian Dembrow, Andrew Duckles, Alma Fernandez, Shawn Mann, Luke Maurer and Darrin McCann – viola
 Armen Anassian, Charlie Bisharat, Roberto Cani, David Ewart, Pam Gates, Julie Gigante, Jessica E. Gudieri, Tamara Hatwan, Ana Landauer, Songa Lee, Natalie Leggett, Phillip Levy, Lisa Liu, Helen Nightengale, Grace Oh, Carol Pool, Irina Voloshina, Amy Wickman and Leah Zeger – violin

Production 
 Don Was – producer
 Jeff Fitzpatrick – engineer
 Steve Genewick – engineer
 Al Schmitt – engineer, mixing
 Eric Boulanger – mastering
 Ivy Skoff – production coordinator 
 Rachel Jones – production assistant
 Jo Ann Kane – music copyist
 Josef Zimmerman – music librarian
 Russ Harrington – photography

Charts

References

2018 albums
Albums produced by Don Was
Trisha Yearwood albums
Jazz albums by American artists